Plekhanov is the name of:

 Dmitri Plekhanov, called Kuretnikov (1642– around the turn of the century), Russian painter 
 Georgi Plekhanov (1856–1918), Russian revolutionary and Marxist theoretician, namesake of library and university
 Vladimir Plekhanov (inventor) (born 1920), Russian firearms designer
 Gennadij Plekhanov (b. 1926), Russian scientist and namesake of the asteroid
 Sergei M. Plekhanov (born 1946), former Soviet Union government adviser, associate professor of Political Science at York University
 Vladimir G. Plekhanov computer scientist
 Vladimir Plekhanov (athlete) (born 1958), Russian triple jumper :de:Wladimir Plechanow
 Dmitri Plekhanov (born 1978), Russian ice hockey player
 Andrei Plekhanov (born 1986), Russian ice hockey player

Plekhanov may also refer to:

 Plekhanov Russian Economic University, public university in Moscow
 Plekhanov House, collection of the Russian National Library in St Petersburg
 14479 Plekhanov, main belt asteroid